Acanthocerataceae is a taxonym. It may refer to:
 Acanthoceratoidea, a superfamily of ammonites
 Acanthocerataceae (alga), a family of algae